Santiago Centenera (born 5 November 1961) is a Spanish equestrian. He competed at the 1992 Summer Olympics and the 1996 Summer Olympics.

References

1961 births
Living people
Spanish male equestrians
Olympic equestrians of Spain
Equestrians at the 1992 Summer Olympics
Equestrians at the 1996 Summer Olympics
Sportspeople from Madrid